Cinema of Obsession: Erotic Fixation and Love Gone Wrong in the Movies by Dominique Mainon and James Ursini is a non-fiction book documenting the history of obsessive love, amour fou and erotic fixation in cinema.

It begins with an overview of "mad love" in literature and myth, then moves quickly into an in-depth overview of the theme in modern cinema. From its origins in the myths of Ovid such as Pygmalion-Galatea, Psyche and Cupid, and Narcissus to medieval tales of tragic love triangles like that of Arthur-Guenivere-Lancelot and Mark-Isolde-Tristan and on to the Romantic tales of the Brontes and twentieth-century works of writers of erotica like Lawrence and Anaïs Nin, this theme has become emblematic in cinema today.

The book features seminal works in obsession themes like Buñuel's Un Chien Andalou, Dietrich's The Blue Angel, Peter Ibbetson, The Phantom of the Opera, Renoir's La Bête Humaine, and Of Human Bondage, which set the groundwork for films to follow. It also defines and examples of the explosive nature of obsessive love with adaptations of legendary films such as Romeo and Juliet, Duel in the Sun, Wuthering Heights, Carmen, Last Tango in Paris, Betty Blue, Sid and Nancy, Eternal Sunshine of the Spotless Mind, and the more recent films of Wong Kar Wai and Almodovar.

Theme
The book's theme encompasses issues of attempted male control over the object of his obsession, which is  highlighted in films like Franju's Eyes Without a Face, Hitchcock's Vertigo and Marnie, Basic Instinct, Visconti's Death in Venice, Fellini's The Temptation of Doctor Anthony. Male masochism, a key element in many of the films, especially film noirs like Criss Cross, The Killers, Gilda, The Postman Always Rings Twice, and more modern explorations like Lolita and Cronenberg's M. Butterfly, earns its own chapter.

The fugitive couple, love on the run, another noir theme, is also studied centering on films like Gun Crazy, Truffaut's Mississippi Mermaid and its recent remake with Angelina Jolie Original Sin, Moulin Rouge!, and Lynch's Wild at Heart. The book shifts gears in its finale and concentrates on the female gaze, films of female obsession: e.g., Jane Eyre, Lady Chatterley's Lover, The Piano, The Story of Adele H., The Lover, Fatal Attraction, Vanilla Sky, to name but a few. 
From the same authors of The Modern Amazons: Warrior Women On-Screen, this book also contains a filmography of over one hundred films including hundreds of illustrations and a complete bibliography.

References

External links

 Official Book Homepage
Seattle Times: Books, Dec. 2007
Publishers Weekly Fall 2007
Author's Home Site
LeonardMaltin's Picks

2007 non-fiction books
Books by Dominique Mainon
Books about film
History of film
Books by James Ursini